Riley Shannon McCusker (born July 9, 2001) is an American artistic gymnast and a six-time member of the United States women's national gymnastics team (2016–2021).  She is the 2019 Pan American Games and 2017 United States national uneven bars champion. In the all-around, she is the 2019 Pan American Games silver medalist and a two-time United States national bronze medalist (2017, 2018). She has also won six medals at the USA Gymnastics National Championships in her senior career. She was a member of the gold-medal-winning American team at the 2018 World Championships and the 2019 Pan American Games. In 2019, she competed at the Birmingham FIG World Cup, earning a silver medal in the all-around behind Olympic champion Aliya Mustafina.

Personal life 
McCusker was born to Tom and Jessica McCusker in 2001, and she has three siblings. They include an older brother, and a younger brother and sister. She began gymnastics in 2008 and was homeschooled. She lived in Brielle, New Jersey, and moved to Phoenix, Arizona as of February 2020.

Junior career

2014: Level 10 
McCusker moved up to Level 10 in the 2014 season at age 12 – Level 10 is the highest level of the USA Gymnastics Junior Olympic program and one step below the elite level. At the time, she was training at Dynamic Gymnastics in Mohegan Lake, New York, under the tutelage of Teodora Ungureanu. At the New York State Championships, she won the all-around title in the Junior A division, as well as titles on bars, beam, and floor.  Two weeks later, she competed at the 2014 Region 6 Championships where she won the all-around and vault titles in the Junior A division and qualified for the J.O. National Championships.  At Nationals, held in Jackson, Mississippi, McCusker placed 30th in the all-around.

2015 
McCusker was absent from competition throughout the entire 2015 season. During that year, she and her family moved from Connecticut to Brielle, New Jersey so that she could train at MG Elite Gymnastics in Morganville, New Jersey with coaches Maggie Haney and Victoria Levine. Her former club did not have the resources for high-level elite training. MG Elite had produced rising junior star Laurie Hernandez at the time.

2016: Junior Elite 
In January 2016, McCusker competed as a junior elite at the 2016 Parkettes Invitational in Allentown, Pennsylvania. She won the all-around title in addition to all four event titles.  On February 4, 2016, she committed to the University of Florida and the Florida Gators gymnastics program. She qualified for the Junior International Elite level in March at the 2016 KPAC Cup.

In May, McCusker competed as a junior at the 2016 American Classic at the Karolyi Ranch in Huntsville, Texas and finished in a tie for fifth. On June 4 at the 2016 U.S. Classic in Hartford, Connecticut, she placed ninth in the all-around and qualified to the U.S. National Championships.

At the 2016 U.S. National Championships in St. Louis, Missouri, McCusker was in second place in the junior all-around after day one of competition with a 56.450. She maintained her placement on Day 2, winning the silver medal in the all-around with a combined total score of 112.000. She also won the silver medal on bars, beam, and floor. Consequently, she was named to the U.S. Junior National Team.

Senior career

2017 
In February McCusker was named as the wildcard athlete for the 2017 AT&T American Cup, an FIG event held on March 4 at the Prudential Center in Newark, New Jersey. McCusker represented the United States alongside 2016 Olympic alternate Ragan Smith. In her senior international debut, McCusker placed 5th overall with a 52.966, behind Kim Bui of Germany, Mélanie de Jesus dos Santos of France, Asuka Teramoto of Japan, and Smith, after a fall off of the uneven bars and a scary fall on her beam dismount, landing on her neck. Despite her struggles on bars and beam, McCusker recorded the second highest scores of the competition (behind Smith) on vault and floor.

In April, McCusker competed at the City of Jesolo Trophy in Italy, where she won the all-around gold medal with a score of 56.600, finishing ahead of Rebeca Andrade of Brazil. She also helped the U.S. win the team gold medal, and she won the gold medal on beam and the silver medal on bars behind Elena Eremina of Russia. After returning from Italy, McCusker suffered both an ankle injury and a wrist injury and was forced to stop regular training for a few months. At the end of July, she competed at the 2017 U.S. Classic. Due to her injury, she did not compete at her highest level and placed eighth on bars, thirteenth on beam, and fourth on floor.

In August at the 2017 U.S. National Championships, McCusker won the bronze medal in the all-around behind Ragan Smith and Jordan Chiles. She became the uneven bars national champion and won the silver medal on beam behind Smith. She also tied for fourth place on floor.

Due to her results at the City of Jesolo Trophy and the National Championships, McCusker was placed on the nominative roster for the 2017 World Championships, but in September she was once again injured and had to withdraw from the Worlds Selection Camp, relinquishing her chance at making that year's World team.

2018 
In June, McCusker competed at the Brestyan's National Qualifier, where she had the highest score on uneven bars and the second highest score on balance beam. She then competed on only two events at the American Classic on July 7. She won the silver medal on beam behind Kara Eaker with a score of 14.000, and she placed seventh on bars after scoring 13.500 with a fall. On July 28, she competed at the 2018 U.S. Classic where she won the silver medal in the all-around and on balance beam, behind Simone Biles on both. She also won the gold medal on bars, one tenth of a point ahead of Alyona Shchennikova, and she placed fourth on floor behind Biles, Jade Carey, and Morgan Hurd.

In August at the 2018 U.S. National Championships, McCusker won the bronze medal in the all-around behind Biles and Morgan Hurd. She also won the silver medal on bars behind Biles, the bronze medal on beam behind Biles and Kara Eaker, and she placed seventh on floor. In October, McCusker participated in the World Team Selection Camp. She placed first on bars, second in the all-around behind Biles, second on beam behind Eaker, third on floor behind Biles and Grace McCallum, and seventh on vault. The following day, she was named to the 2018 World team alongside Biles, Hurd, McCallum, Eaker, and alternate Ragan Smith.

During the qualification round at the 2018 World Championships, McCusker placed eighth in the all-around after falling off beam and having a sub-par bars performance. She did not qualify to the All-Around Final due to teammates Biles and Hurd placing higher than her. During the Team Final, McCusker competed on bars and beam. She rebounded from her troubles in the qualification round to contribute scores of 14.500 on bars and 13.733 on beam towards the U.S. team's total. Her bars score was the second highest of the day behind Biles and tied with two-time Olympic bars champion Aliya Mustafina. The U.S. won the gold medal with a score of 171.629, 8.766 points ahead of second place Russia, beating previous margin of victory records set in the open-ended code of points era at the 2014 World Championships (6.693) and the 2016 Olympic Games (8.209).

2019
In February, USA Gymnastics announced that McCusker was selected to compete at the Birmingham World Cup in March.  There, she won the silver medal in the all-around behind Russian gymnast Aliya Mustafina after counting falls on vault and beam. She recorded the highest scores on bars and floor.

In June, after the conclusion of the American Classic, McCusker was named as one of the eight athletes being considered for the team that would compete at the 2019 Pan American Games, along with Sloane Blakely, Kara Eaker, Aleah Finnegan, Morgan Hurd, Shilese Jones, Sunisa Lee, and Leanne Wong.

In July at the 2019 U.S. Classic, McCusker won the silver medal in the all-around behind Simone Biles with a score of 57.900. In addition, she won the bronze medal on bars behind Hurd and Lee, the silver medal on beam behind Eaker, and she placed fifth on floor behind Biles, Jade Carey, Grace McCallum, and Eaker. After the competition, she was officially named to the 2019 Pan American Games team alongside Eaker, Finnegan, Hurd, and Wong.

At the 2019 Pan American Games, Riley competed on all four events during the team final/qualification round. She contributed scores on bars, beam, and floor to the U.S. team's gold medal winning performance. She qualified to the all-around final in first place with a total of 57.050, just over three tenths ahead of Eaker. Additionally, she also qualified to the uneven bars and floor exercise finals in first place and the balance beam final in second place behind Eaker. During the all-around final, McCusker won the silver medal behind Ellie Black of Canada after she fell off bars while performing her Ricna. On the first day of event finals, McCusker rebounded from her fall in the all-around to win the gold medal on bars ahead of Wong and Black. On the second day of event finals, McCusker won the bronze medal on beam behind Eaker and Black after she fell on her dismount, and she placed fifth on floor after going out of bounds twice.

At the 2019 U.S. National Championships, McCusker competed on all four events on the first day of competition and was in second place on balance beam behind Biles and in fourth place in the all-around behind Biles, Sunisa Lee, and Jade Carey after falling off the uneven bars. On the second day of competition, she competed on vault and uneven bars before her coach decided to pull her from the remaining two events due to McCusker feeling sick to her stomach. She ended up placing seventh on uneven bars, tied with Jordan Chiles. She was added to the national team for the fourth time.

McCusker was one of fifteen gymnasts invited to worlds selection camp and was a frontrunner to make the team. However, one day before the first day of camp, it was announced she had withdrawn from contention due to a case of "mild rhabdomyolysis".

In November McCusker signed her National Letter of Intent with the Florida Gators, starting in the 2020–21 school year.

2020
In February McCusker's coach Maggie Haney was suspended pending the outcome of a hearing into alleged abuse.  As a result McCusker announced on Instagram that she would finish her elite career training at Arizona Sunrays alongside fellow national team member Jade Carey.  It was later revealed that McCusker testified against Haney via a letter read at the hearing, with their relationship starting to worsen after McCusker's loss to Aliya Mustafina at the 2019 Birmingham World Cup.

In May McCusker announced that she will defer attending the University of Florida until after the Olympic Games, which were postponed until 2021 due to the COVID-19 pandemic, starting in the 2021–22 school year.

In November news broke that McCusker had sued her former coaches, Maggie Haney and Victoria Levine, for negligence, intentional infliction of emotional distress, and assault.  McCusker cited how Haney forced her to train with an injured wrist in April 2017, an injured hamstring and a fractured ischium in the months leading up to the 2017 World Championships, foot fractures in early 2018, a torn supraspinous ligament in early 2019, and forced McCusker to train and compete at the 2019 U.S. Classic and 2019 Pan American Games while being diagnosed with exercise-induced rhabdomyolysis.

2021 
McCusker returned to gymnastics at the 2021 Winter Cup, marking her first competition since switching gyms to Arizona Sunrays. She competed every event but floor exercise, finishing second on bars behind reigning national champion on the event, Sunisa Lee.  The following month at a National Team camp McCusker was named to the National Team for the fifth time.  In May McCusker competed at the U.S. Classic.  She got injured during the first rotation after a bad landing on vault and withdrew from the rest of the competition.  At the National Championships McCusker only competed on uneven bars.  She finished second behind Sunisa Lee, achieving the top score on the apparatus on day 2 of the competition.  As a result she was added to the national team and selected to compete at the upcoming Olympic Trials.  At the Olympic Trials McCusker finished fourth on uneven bars after falling off the apparatus on day two of the competition; she was not added to the Olympic team.

NCAA career

2021–2022 season 
McCusker made her NCAA debut on January 7 in a quad meet against Rutgers, Northern Illinois, and Texas Women's.  She only competed on the uneven bars where she scored a 9.825 to help Florida win the meet.

Selected competitive skills

Competitive history

References

External links
 
 

2001 births
Living people
American female artistic gymnasts
Medalists at the World Artistic Gymnastics Championships
People from Brielle, New Jersey
Sportspeople from Monmouth County, New Jersey
U.S. women's national team gymnasts
Gymnasts at the 2019 Pan American Games
Pan American Games medalists in gymnastics
Pan American Games gold medalists for the United States
Pan American Games silver medalists for the United States
Pan American Games bronze medalists for the United States
Medalists at the 2019 Pan American Games
Florida Gators women's gymnasts
21st-century American women